John Hurley may refer to:

 John Hurley (New South Wales politician, born 1796) (1796–1882), member for Narellan, 1859–1880
 John Hurley (New South Wales politician, born 1844) (1844–1911), member for Central Cumberland and Hartley (also member of Queensland Assembly 1883–1884)
 John Hurley (New South Wales politician, born 1894) (1894–1985), member for Albury 1946–1947
 John Hurley (1941–1986), American songwriter 
 John Hurley (footballer) (1884–1972), Australian rules footballer
 John E. Hurley (1906–1992), American politician in Massachusetts